Lisa Canning (born November 7, 1966) is a Virgin Islander American television and radio hostess and correspondent.

Career
Her credits include Entertainment Tonight from 1996 to 1999, co-host of "Knights and Warriors", the first season of Dancing with the Stars, Beyond With James Van Praagh (as the backstage interviewer/skeptic), and the Pax show Destination Stardom.

As an actress, Canning appeared in small roles in the feature films Scream, Intermission, and The Day After Tomorrow.  She has acted on the television soap operas General Hospital and The Young and the Restless.

Personal life
She is married to Harold Austin and lives in Los Angeles, California.

Filmography

Film

Television

References

External links

American film actresses
African-American actresses
American infotainers
American reporters and correspondents
American soap opera actresses
American television personalities
American women television personalities
People from Saint Thomas, U.S. Virgin Islands
1966 births
Living people
21st-century African-American people
21st-century African-American women
20th-century African-American people
20th-century African-American women